Joseph Chhmar Salas (Khmer: យ៉ូសែប ធ្មារ សាឡាស់) 21 October 1937 – September 1977) was a prelate of the Catholic Church who served as bishop Apostolic Vicariate of Phnom Penh in Cambodia from 1975 to 1977, when he died of exhaustion in a forced work camp of the Khmer Rouge. He was the first Cambodian native bishop.

Life 

Salas was born in Phnom Penh on 21 October 1937. For his formation as a priest, he was sent to Paris and was ordained in 1964. His first assignment was in the Apostolic Prefecture of Battambang. He returned to France for more studies.

In April 1975, the Khmer Rouge took power in Cambodia. They founded a Communist state with the name of Democratic Kampuchea, where any religion was forbidden and destruction of religious sites was contemplated. In May 1975, any foreigner in Cambodia was expelled and it included Catholic priests and religious, while natives were forced to work in rice fields and many of them were executed. 

French Bishop Yves Ramousse was at the head of the Cambodian Church when the Khmer Rouge took power. As the prevision was his expulsion from the country for being a foreigner, he called Salas back to Cambodia. On 14 April 1975, the Holy See appointed Salas as Coadjutor Bishop for the Apostolic Vicariate of Phnom Penh. On 30 April, Bishop Ramousse was expelled from the country with many other foreign priests and religious. Most Cambodian priests and religious remained in the country, very few would survive. 

In 1976, Bishop Ramousse resigned as head of the Cambodian Church. Salas became the head, but he was sent by the Khmer Rouge Regime to a rice field in Kompong Thom. He died of exhaustion in September 1977 in the Traing Kork Pagoda. 

On 1 May 2015, the Cambodian Catholic Church officially opened an inquiry into the presumed martyrdom of Joseph Chhmar Salas and another 33 persons who died during the time of the Khmer Rouge regime.

References

External links
 Apostolic Vicariate of Phnom-Penh, Cambodia
 The Catholic Church in Cambodia

1937 births
1977 deaths
20th-century Roman Catholic bishops in Cambodia
People who died in the Cambodian genocide
20th-century Roman Catholic martyrs
20th-century venerated Christians
Servants of God
People from Phnom Penh
Bishops appointed by Pope Paul VI
Cambodian Roman Catholic bishops